Ramadan is a Muslim religious observance.

Ramadan may also refer to:
 Ramadan (calendar month), a month of the Islamic calendar

Places
 Ramadan, Iran, a village in Iran

People
 Ramadan (name), a surname and given name (and list of people with the name)
 Ramadan, a minor Kazakh Jüz horde

Military history
Ramadan Revolution, a 1962 military coup by the Ba'ath Party's Iraqi-wing which overthrew the Prime Minister of Iraq, Abd al-Karim Qasim
Yom Kippur War, also referred to as "Ramadan war"
Ramadan Offensive (2003), series of insurgent attacks against Coalition and Iraqi military targets from the end of October and during much of November 2003
Ramadan Offensive (2006), attacks mounted by insurgents in Iraq during the holy Muslim month of Ramadan in 2006